First Cut was initially a strand of thirty half-hour primetime documentaries commissioned by Channel 4 Commissioning Editor for Documentaries, Sarah Mulvey. It was added to the schedule to replace the old Alt-TV show, which launched many documentary makers' careers including Marc Isaacs, Olly Lambert, Emily James, Tina Gharavi, Paul Berczeller and Morgan Matthew. First Cut aimed to access the brightest and best new talent, allowing young directors to showcase their talent before being given further opportunities on Channel 4's flagship documentaries Cutting Edge and Dispatches.

After the completion of the initial two series (30 episodes), First Cut was commissioned for a third series which began on Friday, 9 January 2009, with a documentary entitled "The Hunt For Britain's Tightest Person".

Series 1 (2007-2008)

Series 2 (2008)

Series 3 (2009)

References

   4Talent: First Cut 
   BFI Film & TV Database 

2007 British television series debuts
2009 British television series endings
2000s British documentary television series
Channel 4 documentary series
English-language television shows